Noreen Mohammad Siddiq (1982–2020) was a Sudanese imam who was known for his recitations of the Quran. He was an imam on the Khartoum Grand Mosque, Mrs. Sanhouri, the Al-Nour Mosque, and some of famous mosques within the capital, Khartoum. He died at the age of 38 after a car crash, along with several other Quranic reciters.

His family 
The late Sheikh Noreen had four wives and eight children. Among his eight children there are both son and daughter. His eldest offspring is a daughter.

Biography 
Sheikh Noreen Muhammad Siddiq was born in 1982 in a town called Farajab in Sudan, and he studied boarding in Khorsi in 1998, and was a student of a great scholar named Sheikh Makki in Sudan. After graduating, he went on to study Islam in Khorsi. He spent 20 years seeking education under various scholars, but later became a disciple of Sheikh Makki in Khartoum, the Sudanese capital. Sheikh “Noreen” changed into born in Umm Dam locality in North Kordofan state in 1982, and grew up in a spiritual house. He memorized the Qur’an with intonation on the age of 17 years on my novels Al Douri and Hafs, after which he studied on the clinical Institute, then joined the Islamic Holy Quran university and graduated there.

His vocal style corresponds to the best hearing and ease pain while listening, typical for the countries of the southern belt of the Sahara, stretching from West Africa to the Horn of Africa.

Through videos of his recitations on social media, Noreen became famous across the Muslim world.

See also 
 Quran
 Qi'rat (Quranic recitation)

References 

Quran reciters
1982 births
2020 deaths
Sudanese religious leaders
Road incident deaths in Africa